Symmimetis muscosa is a moth in the family Geometridae. It is found in Queensland, New Guinea, Borneo and possibly Bali. The habitat consists of dipterocarp and lowland forests.

References

Moths described in 1907
Eupitheciini